An Leadhb Gharbh (anglicized as Leabgarrow) is a Gaeltacht village on Arranmore Island, which is to the west of County Donegal about three miles from Burtonport. The island's post office, secondary school and ferry port are located in Leabgarrow. Leabgarrow also hosts a cafe and numerous pubs and bars.

The islands co-working facility intended for remote workers is located in Leabgarrow.

References

See also
 List of towns and villages in Ireland

Gaeltacht places in County Donegal
Gaeltacht towns and villages
The Rosses
Towns and villages in County Donegal
Articles on towns and villages in Ireland possibly missing Irish place names